Pribinovići was a village in Bosnia and Herzegovina. According to the 1991 census, the village was located in the municipality of Široki Brijeg.

Within the municipality of Široki Brijeg, a new settlement Mokro was created by merging the settlements Duboko Mokro and Pribinovići.

Demographics 
According to the 2013 census, the population of Mokro was 1,411.

References

Populated places in Široki Brijeg